The Canadian Half Marathon Championships is the annual national championships for the half marathon in Canada sanctioned by Athletics Canada.

The event is currently hosted by the Manitoba Marathon weekend, which is awarded hosting duties from 2019 through 2022. It was previously hosted by the Calgary Marathon weekend  and the Banque Scotia 21K de Montréal.

The 2018 championships hosted by the Calgary Half Marathon was won by Calgarian Trevor Hofbauer.

Results

See also
Athletics Canada
Canadian records in track and field
Canadian Track and Field Championships
Canadian Marathon Championships
Canadian 10Km Road Race Championships
Canadian 5Km Road Race Championships
Sports in Canada

References

Half marathons in Canada
National athletics competitions
Annual sporting events in Canada